Marion Township, Arkansas may refer to:

 Marion Township, Bradley County, Arkansas
 Marion Township, Drew County, Arkansas
 Marion Township, Lawrence County, Arkansas
 Marion Township, Ouachita County, Arkansas
 Marion Township, Phillips County, Arkansas
 Marion Township, Sebastian County, Arkansas
 Marion Township, White County, Arkansas

See also 
 List of townships in Arkansas
 Marion Township (disambiguation)

Arkansas township disambiguation pages